is a Japanese publishing company that focuses on manga-related publications and is also involved in the development of anime and live-action adaptations. It was founded on June 5, 2001, by Yoshihiro Hosaka along with former manga artists of Enix (now Square Enix). The company performed a merger with Production I.G on December 1, 2007, to form the new company IG Port, becoming one of IG Port's subsidiaries alongside Signal.MD and Wit Studio.

History
Mag Garden was founded on June 5, 2001, by Yoshihiro Hosaka, who previously worked as an editor from Enix (now Square Enix) before leaving. It started out as a spin-out company from Enix's manga publishing division before the company merged with Square. The Square-Enix merger resulted in an uprising with some of the manga artist staff. Fearing their manga being dropped out of publication and tired of the harsh treatment, they left Square Enix to help create Mag Garden, where they would also continue serializing their series. The establishment of Mag Garden and the former manga artists' departure from Square Enix prompted legal disputes over copyright issues between the two companies. The legal battle was concluded in March 2003 and Square Enix agreed to contribute 50% of Mag Garden's capital. Manga that was once published under Enix from the former authors had to continue serialization under new titles. On September 22, 2003, Mag Garden became a separate, independent company and was admitted in the Tokyo Stock Exchange's "Mothers" market after Square Enix sold all of its remaining shares.

On July 4, 2007, the company announced a merger with Production I.G to form a new company called IG Port. Mag Garden has a steady relationship with Production I.G as they have both collaborated on such cross-media anime/manga projects like Ghost Hound and Sisters of Wellber. Previously, Production I.G was Mag Garden's #2 shareholder as they owned 15% of their stock. The merger was completed on December 1, 2007, in which Mag Garden has officially become a subsidiary of IG Port.

Among the manga artists who moved to Mag Garden were Kozue Amano, Rin Asano, Mayumi Azuma, Nanae Chrono, Moyamu Fujino, Maki Hakoda, Sakura Kinoshita, Satomi Kubo, Hiro Matsuba, Minene Sakurano, Kazusa Saitou, Kaili Sorano, Seiuchirou Todono, Sirou Tunasima, and Natsuki Yoshimura.

Published magazines
Active
 Monthly Comic Avarus
 Monthly Comic Garden
 Eden
 Web Comic Beat's

Discontinued
 Comic Blade Masamune
 Comic Blade Brownie
 Comic Blade Gunz
 Comic Blade Zebel
 Monthly Comic Blade

References

External links
Official website 

 
IG Port
Manga distributors
Publishing companies established in 2001
Japanese companies established in 2001
Chiyoda, Tokyo
Mass media in Tokyo
Book publishing companies in Tokyo
Comic book publishing companies in Tokyo
Magazine publishing companies in Tokyo